Cambridge is a city in Story County, Iowa, United States. The population was 827 at the 2020 census. It is part of the Ames, Iowa Metropolitan Statistical Area, which is a part of the larger Ames-Boone, Iowa Combined Statistical Area.

Geography

Demographics

2010 census
As of the census of 2010, there were 827 people, 310 households, and 221 families residing in the city. The racial makeup of the city was 97.1% White, 0.4% African American, 0.5% Native American, 0.6% Asian, 0.4% from other races, and 1.1% from two or more races. Hispanic or Latino of any race were 2.9% of the population.

There were 310 households, of which 36.8% had children under the age of 18 living with them, 61.9% were married couples living together, 6.1% had a female householder with no husband present, 3.2% had a male householder with no wife present, and 28.7% were non-families. 21.6% of all households were made up of individuals, and 10.9% had someone living alone who was 65 years of age or older. The average household size was 2.67 and the average family size was 3.18.

The median age in the city was 34.9 years. 28.5% of residents were under the age of 18; 7.9% were between the ages of 18 and 24; 28.4% were from 25 to 44; 24.1% were from 45 to 64; and 11% were 65 years of age or older. The gender makeup of the city was 48.5% male and 51.5% female.

2000 census
As of the census of 2000, there were 819 people, 314 households, and 216 families residing in the city. The racial makeup of the city was 95.60% White, 0.73% African American, 0.37% Native American, 0.73% Asian, 0.61% from other races, and 1.95% from two or more races. Hispanic or Latino of any race were 2.81% of the population.

There were 314 households, out of which 36.3% had children under the age of 18 living with them, 57.3% were married couples living together, 8.6% had a female householder with no husband present, and 30.9% were non-families. 22.9% of all households were made up of individuals, and 7.6% had someone living alone who was 65 years of age or older. The average household size was 2.61 and the average family size was 3.11.

In the city, the population was spread out, with 27.8% under the age of 18, 8.1% from 18 to 24, 33.2% from 25 to 44, 21.7% from 45 to 64, and 9.2% who were 65 years of age or older. The median age was 34 years. For every 100 females, there were 95.5 males. For every 100 females age 18 and over, there were 99.7 males.

The median income for a household in the city was $42,059, and the median income for a family was $49,375. Males had a median income of $31,638 versus $25,724 for females. The per capita income for the city was $18,524. About 6.9% of families and 8.6% of the population were below the poverty line, including 11.9% of those under age 18 and 16.3% of those age 65 or over.

Education
Cambridge is served by the Ballard Community School District.

References

External links

 
City website

Cities in Iowa
Cities in Story County, Iowa